Alan Sherman (born 1957) is a computer scientist.

Alan, Allan, or Al Sherman may also refer to:
Allan Sherman (1924–1973), American comedy writer, television producer, and song parodist
Alan Sherman (rowing) (born 1951), British rowing coxswain
Al Sherman (1897–1973), American Tin Pan Alley songwriter
Alan Sherman, co-worker and son of race horse trainer Art Sherman, the trainer of record for California Chrome

See also
Allie Sherman (1923–2015), American NFL running back and head coach